Kallieis (full form Δήμος Καλλιέων) is a former municipality in the northern part of Phocis, Greece. Since the 2011 local government reform it is part of the municipality Delphi, of which it is a municipal unit. The municipal unit has an area of 183.256 km2. Its registered population in 2011 amounted to 1,673. The seat of the municipality was Mavrolithari, which is home to about 20% of the municipal unit population.

Municipal districts

Athanasios Diakos
Kastriotissa
Mavrolithari
Moussounitsa
Panourgias
Pyra
Stromi

Population

Geography

The municipality is mostly mountainous, with Mount Giona dominating the north, towards the boundary with Phthiotis. Most of the area is forested. Typical vegetation includes pine, fir, cypress and spruce trees; the higher altitudes are mostly barren, while and farmland is limited to the low-lying valleys. Main industries are agriculture and tourism.

See also
List of settlements in Phocis

External links
Official website of the Municipality of Kallieis
 Kallieis or Kallies on the GTP Travel Pages

References

Populated places in Phocis